Upchurch is a community within the Town of Cary in Wake County, North Carolina, United States.

Geography
Upchurch is located at  (35.7893170 -78.857507), south of the community of Carpenter.

History
Upchurch is a former unincorporated community that was recently annexed into the Town of Cary.

References

External links
 

Geography of Cary, North Carolina
Neighborhoods in North Carolina